The men's 20 kilometres walk at the 2017 World Championships in Athletics was held on a two kilometre course comprising lengths of The Mall between Buckingham Palace and Admiralty Arch on 13 August.

Summary

As is typical, this race started off as a pack.  By 5K, the pack still numbered 32, exactly half the starters, walking a leisurely (for them) 19:54.  The second 5K was exactly the same, passed in 39:48 but the pack had worn down to 17.  British champion, walking before the home crowd, accelerated the pace, dropping many off the pack.  But out in front, Bosworth was given more scrutiny and earned the deadly red card disqualifying him from the race.  By 15K in 59:33 (19:45), the pack was down to eight and defending champion Miguel Ángel López (Spain) was no longer one of them. Rallying from a 23 second deficit at 10K, South African Lebogang Shange came back to the group as others dropped off.  By the last 2K loop, the leaders Éider Arévalo (Colombia) and Sergey Shirobokov, an Authorised Neutral Athlete were in racewalking's version of a sprint finish, dropping Shange, Christopher Linke (Germany), Dane Bird-Smith  (Australia), Wang Kaihua (China) and Caio Bonfim (Brazil) to fight for bronze.  Arévalo broke the race open enough to get a Colombian flag from the audience, holding it around his neck as he made sure he had enough of a gap on Shirobokov, then crossing the finish line with the flag held high two seconds ahead.  9 second behind them, Bonfim had broken away from Shange to secure bronze.  Arévalo, Bonfim and Shange all set national records.

Records
Before the competition records were as follows:

The following records were set at the competition:

Qualification standard
The standard to qualify automatically for entry was 1:24:00.

Results
The final took place on 13 August at 14:19. The results were as follows:

References

20 km walk
Racewalking at the World Athletics Championships